Nesar is a village in Hamadan Province, Iran.

Nesar may refer to:
Nesar, Ardabil, a village in Iran
Nesar, Kermanshah, a village in Iran
Nesar-e-Bala, village in Iran
Nesar-e Pain, village in Iran
Nesar-e Bozorg, village in Iran
Nesar-e Chalab Zard, village in Iran
Nesar-e Eskandari, village in Iran
Nesar-e Kuchek, village in Iran
Nesar-e Meleh Maran, village in Iran
Nesar Ahmad Bahave (b. 1985), Afghanistani Taekwando practitioner

See also
Nesareh (disambiguation)